Jaguarão is a municipality in the southern Brazilian state of Rio Grande do Sul located on the shores of the Jaguarão River, bordering Uruguay.

It lies a short distance inland from the Mirim Lagoon.

Geographical and historical proximity to Uruguay

In 1865 it was the site of the Battle of Jaguarão, fought against Uruguayan forces.

Located in the extreme south of Brazil and the border with Uruguay, the Baron of Mauá International Bridge links it with Río Branco.

References

External links

 
Municipalities in Rio Grande do Sul